The 2010 Catalan regional election was held on Sunday, 28 November 2010, to elect the 9th Parliament of the autonomous community of Catalonia. All 135 seats in the Parliament were up for election. This was the first election held in Catalonia after the Constitutional Court of Spain struck down parts of the regional 2006 Statute of Autonomy that granted new powers of self-rule to the region. The ruling came after four years of deliberation concerning a constitutional appeal filed by the conservative People's Party (PP) under Mariano Rajoy and was met with anger and street protests throughout the region.

The election resulted in a resounding victory for the Convergence and Union (CiU) federation under Artur Mas, whose 62 seats—six short of an absolute majority—virtually ensured that no alternative government was mathematically possible, as the left-wing alliance which had formed the government of Catalonia for the previous seven years fell to a bare 48 seats. The  coalition formed by the Socialists' Party of Catalonia (PSC), Republican Left of Catalonia (ERC) and Initiative for Catalonia Greens (ICV) was already at the brink of split going into the election, with political disagreements between the former allies having led Catalan president José Montilla to announce that he would not seek a third alliance with ERC and ICV even if election numbers favored such a possibility. The election saw a collapse in support for all three parties and Montilla's retirement from the PSC leadership shortly afterwards.

The PP had one of its best showings in a Catalan regional election, with 12.4% of the vote and 18 seats. Albert Rivera's Citizens (C's) party saw a slight increase in its vote share, whereas the pro-Catalan independence Catalan Solidarity for Independence (SI) led by former FC Barcelona president Joan Laporta secured 4 seats in the Parliament.

Overview

Electoral system
The Parliament of Catalonia was the devolved, unicameral legislature of the autonomous community of Catalonia, having legislative power in regional matters as defined by the Spanish Constitution and the Catalan Statute of Autonomy, as well as the ability to vote confidence in or withdraw it from a regional president.

As a result of no regional electoral law having been approved since the re-establishment of Catalan autonomy, the electoral procedure came regulated under Transitory Provision Fourth of the 1979 Statute, supplemented by the provisions within the Organic Law of General Electoral Regime. Voting for the Parliament was on the basis of universal suffrage, which comprised all nationals over 18 years of age, registered in Catalonia and in full enjoyment of their political rights. The 135 members of the Parliament of Catalonia were elected using the D'Hondt method and a closed list proportional representation, with an electoral threshold of three percent of valid votes—which included blank ballots—being applied in each constituency. Seats were allocated to constituencies, corresponding to the provinces of Barcelona, Girona, Lleida and Tarragona, with each being allocated a fixed number of seats.

The use of the D'Hondt method might result in a higher effective threshold, depending on the district magnitude.

Election date
The term of the Parliament of Catalonia expired four years after the date of its previous election, unless it was dissolved earlier. The regional president was required to call an election fifteen days prior to the date of expiry of parliament, with election day taking place within from forty to sixty days after the call. The previous election was held on 1 November 2006, which meant that the legislature's term would have expired on 1 November 2010. The election was required to be called no later than 17 October 2010, with it taking place up to the sixtieth day from the call, setting the latest possible election date for the Parliament on Thursday, 16 December 2010.

The president had the prerogative to dissolve the Parliament of Catalonia and call a snap election, provided that no motion of no confidence was in process and that dissolution did not occur before one year had elapsed since a previous one under this procedure. In the event of an investiture process failing to elect a regional president within a two-month period from the first ballot, the Parliament was to be automatically dissolved and a fresh election called.

Parliamentary composition
The Parliament of Catalonia was officially dissolved on 5 October 2010, after the publication of the dissolution decree in the Official Journal of the Government of Catalonia. The table below shows the composition of the parliamentary groups in the chamber at the time of dissolution.

Parties and candidates
The electoral law allowed for parties and federations registered in the interior ministry, coalitions and groupings of electors to present lists of candidates. Parties and federations intending to form a coalition ahead of an election were required to inform the relevant Electoral Commission within ten days of the election call, whereas groupings of electors needed to secure the signature of at least one percent of the electorate in the constituencies for which they sought election, disallowing electors from signing for more than one list of candidates.

Below is a list of the main parties and electoral alliances which contested the election:

Opinion polls
The tables below list opinion polling results in reverse chronological order, showing the most recent first and using the dates when the survey fieldwork was done, as opposed to the date of publication. Where the fieldwork dates are unknown, the date of publication is given instead. The highest percentage figure in each polling survey is displayed with its background shaded in the leading party's colour. If a tie ensues, this is applied to the figures with the highest percentages. The "Lead" column on the right shows the percentage-point difference between the parties with the highest percentages in a poll.

Graphical summary

Voting intention estimates
The table below lists weighted voting intention estimates. Refusals are generally excluded from the party vote percentages, while question wording and the treatment of "don't know" responses and those not intending to vote may vary between polling organisations. When available, seat projections determined by the polling organisations are displayed below (or in place of) the percentages in a smaller font; 68 seats were required for an absolute majority in the Parliament of Catalonia.

Results

Overall

Distribution by constituency

Aftermath

Notes

References
Opinion poll sources

Other

Catalonia
Regional elections in Catalonia
2010 in Catalonia
November 2010 events in Europe